The Ford L-series (also named Ford Louisville or, for the 1990s aerodynamic models, Ford Aeromax) is a range of heavy-duty trucks that were assembled and marketed by Ford between 1970 and 1998.  Ford had been producing their "Heavy Duty" trucks since 1948 and their "Super Duty" lineup since 1958 marketed by various GVW ratings.  Truck weight classifications 1-8 were a new concept brought about by the DOT National Highway Administration. The first dedicated Class 8 truck produced by the company, the L-series range replaced the F-series "Super Duty" and N-series (short conventional derived from the F-series).  Produced as both straight trucks and semitractors, the Ford L-series encompassed a wide range of models through the Class 6-8 GVWR ratings in medium-duty, severe-service, and vocational applications.  The line would become one of the most popular series of trucks Ford ever produced.

The L series was produced in the Kentucky Truck Plant near Louisville, Kentucky, which gave rise to the nickname "Louisville Line" trucks; as part of a 1996 redesign, part of the model line officially took on the Louisville nameplate.

Following the sale of the Ford heavy-truck line to Freightliner in 1996, the L-series was discontinued by Ford at the end of 1998. Freightliner would concurrently take over production of the Ford L-series, opening its Sterling Trucks subsidiary; the L-series became the Sterling A line, Acterra, and L line, remaining in production until 2009 when Sterling Trucks closed operations.

Background 

In 1963, Ford produced its first short BBC conventional with the introduction of the N-series Super Duty, supplementing the Super Duty models of the F-series.  As Ford did with the H-series cabover (derived from the C-series and nicknamed the "Two-Story Falcon"), an all-new chassis raised the cab upward; while sharing its grille with the H-series, the N-series shared its cab with the F-series pickup trucks.

By the 1960s, Ford sought to modernize and streamline its heavy-truck line.  In 1961, the heavy-duty F-series (F-750 to F-1100) became a larger, separate model line along with introduction of the all new H-series Linehauler. In 1966, the H-series was replaced by the all-new W-series cabover.  In a change from adapting the F-series to become a heavy truck and to replace the N-series, Ford began design work on an all-new truck range, which became the L-series.  With an all-new heavier-duty chassis, the L-series also featured a larger cab; to improve serviceability, the design included a front-hinged hood.

First generation (1970–1995) 

For 1970, the L-series was introduced in four size ranges, two hood lengths and grille styles, and with single or tandem (denoted by the "T" in the model designation) rear axles.  Powertrains included a wide range of gasoline and diesel engines, based on GVWR.

In 1971, Ford introduced a set-back front axle configuration.  For the rest of the 1970s, the L-series saw few major changes.  In 1976, the LL/LTL-9000 was introduced.  Designed as a truck for long-haul drivers, the LTL-9000 was a competitor to the GMC General, Kenworth W900, Mack Super-Liner, and Peterbilt 359.  Fitted with a set-forward front axle and a longer hood, this version had more room for larger powertrains.  In 1981, Ford gave the LL/LTL-9000 its own grille and headlight styling, including one of the first uses of the Ford Blue Oval in North America.

Although the L-series would see few revisions throughout its production, elements of its design would see use in other Ford vehicles.  In 1974, the W-series cabover received a larger grille similar to the chrome version on the L series.  For 1978, the F-series/Bronco grille was given a similar egg-crate grille pattern.  In the 1980 redesign of the medium-duty F- series, the hexagonal shape of the grille was carried over; it is a theme used in all Super Duty trucks since their 1998 introduction.

In 1984 (as 1985 model year), the rest of the L-series became one of the last North American Fords to adopt the Ford Blue Oval; as with the LTL-9000, it was placed above the grille.  In 1988, the L-series changed its grille design from an egg-crate design to that of horizontal chrome bars; the Ford Blue Oval became centered.  In addition, rectangular headlights became standard in 1991.

1992 saw the introduction of the set-back front axle version of the LL/LTL-9000, designated the LLS and LTLS-9000, along with the corresponding Aeromax versions that had more aerodynamic bumpers and optional chassis skirting.

Aeromax (1988–1995) 

As a response to the aerodynamic Kenworth T600, for 1988, Ford introduced its own aerodynamic semitractor. Named AeroMax L9000, the new design was an extensive upgrade of the L-9000. While sharing the same cab of the medium hood LS-9000, the Aeromax used a set-back front axle to add a form-fitting front bumper with swept front fenders. For the first time in a North American truck, automotive-style composite headlights were used. Other aerodynamic enhancements included skirted fuel tanks and a specially designed "Aero Bullet" sleeper unit. The Aeromax L9000 was one of the most aerodynamic trucks in North America upon its introduction in 1988.

Following its introduction as a semitractor, the AeroMax line expanded into the vocational truck lineup alongside the rest of the Ford L series. A later LA-8000 was introduced for "Baby 8" intra-city delivery.

1992 saw the introduction of the extended hood, set-back front axle Aeromaxes, designated LLA and LTLA-9000. These featured optional full-length chassis skirting, along with the same aero headlights and bumpers of the older medium hood LA series.

Models 
The L-series came in a total of four size ranges, designated by GVWR.  As with previous Ford heavy-truck tradition, gasoline-engine trucks received a three-digit model number while diesel-engine trucks were given a four-digit model number.  L-600/L-6000 and L-700/L-7000 series were Class 6/7 medium-duty trucks, typically sold as straight trucks.  L-800/L-8000 trucks were Class 8 trucks, typically sold in severe-service configurations.  L-900/L-9000 chassis were available in all axle configurations, but were typically sold as semitractors; the LTL-9000 was only sold with a diesel engine.

1973–1977 Models

Powertrain 
Almost all models had at least one engine option, the 9000 series had several. The 600–800 series had a Ford 361 V8 standard, 700–900 had a 475 V8 optional. The 900 series had a 401 V8 standard. In 1977 the 361 V8 was replaced by a 370, and the 401 V8 was replaced by a 429; the 475 V8 remained an option. Detroit 6-71,6-92,8-71 and 8-92 were a option also.

The 7000 and 8000 series had a Caterpillar V175 standard, the 7000 had a V200 and the 8000 had a V225 available.

1973 engines (not all are shown.)

Second generation (1996–1998) 

For 1996, the Ford heavy-truck lines were redesigned, the second-generation heavy-truck line was nearly exclusively for Class 8 weight ranges.

On tandems a walking beam type was standard and 2 different air suspensions were available.

In the redesign, both the Aeromax and Louisville gained a wider cab with a sloping windshield.  Although Aeromax models would lose their composite headlights, it gained a much larger slope to the hood.  To aid ergonomics, the Aeromax and Louisville would borrow many interior controls from other Ford vehicles. Another redesign was the grille bars, in the second generation the trucks that had extended frame bumpers knocked of the "middle" full painted piece off the grille.

Models 
As was the case previously, the heavy truck line was split into aerodynamically optimized semitractors (the newly renamed Aeromax 9500) and vocational/severe-service trucks.  In the case of the latter, the popularity of the Louisville nickname led Ford to drop the L-series nomenclature and adopt the Louisville nameplate officially.

1996 models

Powertrain 
The second generation didn't offer gasoline or diesel V8s, all engines were inline 6 turbocharged diesels. The Caterpillar 3406 and Cummins N14 (the evolution of the NTC series) continued as heavy duty engines in the 9000 models.

1996 engines (Not all are shown)

End of Ford production (1998) 

At the end of 1996, Ford completed the sale of its heavy-truck operations, selling the rights and production tools of the Louisville, Aeromax, and Cargo to Freightliner.  Ford would end production of the Louisville/Aeromax in 1998; the truck lines would re-enter production as Sterling Trucks from 1998 to 2009; both lines were produced concurrently by Ford and Freightliner during 1998.

In 1998 Sterling began production in St. Thomas, Ontario, Canada, of their L-Line 7500, 8500, 9500, and A-Line 9500. A Mercedes Benz diesel was introduced and a very low profile “CarHauler” model was developed, otherwise there was very little change between 1998 and 2008. Production ended in 2009.

Notes

References

Resources 

American Truck & Bus Spotter's Guide: 1920–1985, by Tad Burness.
Ford Trucks Since 1905, by James K. Wagner.
Ford Heavy Duty Trucks 1948–1998, by Paul G. McLaughlin.
Ford Truck Chronicles:  by the Auto Editors of Consumers Guide.

External links 

L series
Vehicles introduced in 1970
Class 6 trucks
Class 7 trucks
Class 8 trucks